The women's high jump event  at the 1984 European Athletics Indoor Championships was held on 4 March.

Results

References

High jump at the European Athletics Indoor Championships
High
Euro